Thomas Williams (November 5, 1779 – September 29, 1876) was an American Congregationalist minister and author.

Williams was born in Pomfret, Conn., Nov. 5, 1779, the son of Joseph and Lucy (Witter) Williams.

He entered the Freshman Class of Williams College in the fall of 1795, and continued there until March, 1798. In the succeeding fall he entered the Junior Class of Yale College, where he graduated in 1800.  Before graduation he had begun to teach, and after successive engagements in Beverly, Mass , and in Woodstock and Norwich, Conn., he opened in the spring of 1803 in Boston a school for African-American pupils. 

While thus employed he was licensed to preach, May 17, 1803, by the Windham County Association, in order that he might officiate as chaplain in the almshouse in Boston, in connection with his other duties. Late in the same year he gave up his school, and served for some weeks as a missionary preacher in New York State. On his return, and after spending six weeks with Rev. Dr. Emmons, of Franklin, Mass, (his entire course of theological preparation), he was ordained as an evangelist, at Killingly, Conn., May 16, 1804. 

Two other missionary tours to New York succeeded, and in the summer of 1806 he supplied the pulpit of the Congregational Church in Branford, Conn.  In January 1807, without formal installation, he took charge of the Pacific Congregational Church in Providence, R. I., where he continued until April, 1816. He was next installed pastor, Nov. 6, 1816, of the church in Foxborough, Mass., which he served for about four years. In July, 1821, he returned to his former charge in Providence, and remained with them until August, 1823.  In Dec, 1823, he began to preach for the First Church in Attleborough, Mass., and was installed there Sept. 29, 1824, Dr. Emmons preaching the sermon, as well as at his former installation. From this church he was dismissed, Dec. 11, 1827; and at the same time a new church was formed in Hebronville, in the southern part of the town, of which  Williams became at once the pastor, without formal installation, and so continued until April, 1830, when he removed to Providence, after which he was employed for four or five years in occasional preaching through the State From May, 1835, to March, 1838, he preached statedly to the Congregational Church in Barrington, R. I., his last regular engagement.

In 1839-40 he resided in Hartford, Conn., and then for three years in East Greenwich, R. I., whence he returned to Providence, where his residence continued until his death. During all these years, until extreme old age, he was restlessly employed in his calling, preaching as he found opportunity over a wide circuit.  His last appearance in the pulpit was in 1872, when in his 93rd year he died in Providence, Sept. 29, 1876, aged 97 years, lacking 36 days, of old age, with no indication of disease.  For upwards of 13 years he had been the last survivor of the Yale class of 1800 and since March, 1873, the sole living Yale graduate of the eighteenth century. 

He was married, May 20, 1812, to Ruth, daughter of Isaac and Ruth (Jewett) Hale, of Newbury (old town), Mass. She died in Providence, March 7, 1867, in her 79th year. They had seven children, four sons and three daughters, of whom three sons survived him, one of whom graduated Yale in 1842.  His published writings comprise some thirty sermons and discourses.

External links
 Books by Williams

1779 births
1876 deaths
Yale College alumni
American Congregationalist ministers
Williams College alumni
People from Pomfret, Connecticut
American male writers
People from Providence, Rhode Island